Hermann Thomaschek (13 April 1824 – 11 December 1910) was a German operatic bass.

Life 
Born in Czerniki, Ostpreußen, as Sohn eines evangelischen Pfarrers studierte Thomaschek an der Albertus-Universität Königsberg  Theologie und Philologie. 1846 wurde er Mitglied der . Won for singing by Eduard Mantius in 1847, he was trained by Franz Hauser in Munich. It followed annually changing engagements: Hoftheater Sondershausen (1849/50), Mainfranken Theater Würzburg. (1850/51), Barfüsserkloster Zurich (1851/52), Volkstheater Rostock (1852/53), Staatstheater Kassel (1853/54), Deutsche Oper Amsterdam (1854/55),  (1855/56) and Szczecin City Theatre (1856/57). With a Wanderbühne, he was in Lausanne and Chambéry in 1857/58. Then he found firm engagements in Theater Lübeck. (1858/59), at the Staatstheater Nürnberg, at the Salzburger Landestheater (1861/62) and at the Theater Basel (1862/63). After he had worked in 1864/65 at Stralsund Theatre had been a singer and director, he went even further north in 1865/66, to the new (German) Latvian National Opera. After the Proclamation of the German Empire, he came to the Landestheater Altenburg. In 1873/74, he sang at the Stadttheater Freiburg in the Augustinian Monastery, Freiburg, in the following season at the Stadttheater Magdeburg. He then lived in Chemnitz where his wife Luise Schmidt (1829–1887) was a singing teacher. Thomascheck won another engagement at the Sondershausen (1877/78) and in Trier (1878/79). For many years, he was engaged in vocal pedagogy. He spent his 23 years as a widower in a home for needy stage artists, which Marie Seebach had donated in Weimar in her will.

Thomaschek died in Weimar at the age of 86.

Roles 
 Il Commendatore in Don Giovanni 
 Oroveso in Norma
 Giorgio in I puritani
 Gaveston in La dame blanche
 Marcel in Les Huguenots
 Sarastro in Die Zauberflöte
 Kaspar in Der Freischütz
 Landgraf in Tannhäus

References

External links 
 

German operatic basses
1824 births
1910 deaths
People from Kętrzyn County